Alistipes finegoldii is a bacterium from the genus of Alistipes which has been isolated from appendix tissue from a human from Helsinki in Finland. The species is named in honor of Sydney M. Finegold.

References

Bacteria described in 2003
Bacteroidia